The LRSVM Morava is a modular, multi-calibre, multi-pod self-propelled multiple rocket launcher designed and developed by the Serbian Military Technical Institute. The system is designed to offer subsystem modularity, enabling integration with wheeled or tracked platforms to fire unguided rockets of various calibres to engage targets at ranges between 8 km and 40 km.

As of 2019, the Morava is in service with Serbian Armed Forces on a FAP 1118 4x4 cross-country truck and with the United Arab Emirates (UAE) on a Nimr 6×6 chassis.

Development 
Development of the LRSVM Morava began in early 2010, and was displayed for the first time at the Partner 2011 military exhibition in Belgrade. The development of the project aimed to create a single platform able to mount various existing rockets of different calibres and warheads to replace the current generation of Russian BM-21 Grad and Serbian M-77 Oganj and M-63 Plamen within the Serbian Armed Forces. Overall design and development of the Morava was conducted by the Military Technical Institute (VTI), while the launcher was assigned to the 14. oktobar company, which built the prototype launcher and is expected to conduct the planned serial production. Rocket containers for the Morava were designed and produced by INhrom from Čačak .

Same technology developed for LRSVM Morava is now used to modernize existing M-77 Oganj and to produce new M18 Oganj with increased capabilities.

Design
The LRSVM Morava system is based on a modified  FAP 1118 4x4 military truck that provides a good tactical mobility. It is equipped with a double container with 12–16 launching tubes, which can fire all current Plamen, Oganj and Grad rockets, including HE-FRAG, incendiary, thermobaric, cluster with anti-personnel or anti-tank mines. It is possible to combine two different modules for example one container with Plamen A and one container with Grad rockets giving a unique capabilities of attacking close and ranged targets in the same time.

Range and direction correction system provides better accuracy with respect to its predecessors. The Morava can launch single rocket, partial ripple or full salvo, which can cover an area of 32 hectares.
The LRSVM is equipped with fully automatic targeting control systems. The launch vehicle is fitted with an Inertial Navigation System (INS), GPS unit and absolute encoders for automatic positioning. Vehicle has ballistic computer with automatic or manual data input and firing elements computation. Rockets are launched directly form the cab or remotely form the vehicle. The LRSVM can fire single rockets or full salvo. A crew of three prepares this artillery system for firing within 45 seconds. It leaves firing position within 30 seconds.

The Morava launching vehicle is reloaded within 5 minutes and a full salvo duration is 15-25s depending on rocket type.

While traveling the rocket launcher is covered by hydraulically operated canvas cover (first such camouflage world implementation was on M-77 Oganj), which makes it hard to recognize, as vehicle looks like an ordinary light utility truck. Also it protects the launcher from adverse weather effects.

There is an export version of LRSVM Morava on FAP 1318.

Rockets 

There are several domestic models of rockets, within models there are several types (different warheads and fuses for example) and there are also possibilities to use all models of Grad 122mm rockets from manufactures worldwide. New model of Oganj rocket with extended range of 30 km which uses inertial guidance firing controller to achieve better CEP is ready to go in production. There is also in final stage of development new 50 km range rocket.

Operators 
 - Donated to the Libyan National Army by the United Arab Emirates in 2020.
 - Around 31 systems ordered in 2015.

Gallery

See also 
 BM-14 140mm multiple rocket launcher
 BM-21 Grad 122mm multiple rocket launcher
 9A52-4 Tornado
 LAR-160
 T-122 Sakarya
 Fajr-5
 M-63 Plamen
 M-77 Oganj
 M-87 Orkan

References

External links 
 LRSVM live fire test - VTI Military Technical Institute
 LRSVM live fire test - YouTube

Rocket artillery
Self-propelled artillery of Serbia
Military Technical Institute Belgrade
Multiple rocket launchers
Modular rocket launchers
Military vehicles introduced in the 2010s